Newbury is a market town in the county of Berkshire, England, and is home to the administrative headquarters of West Berkshire Council. The town centre around its large market square retains a rare medieval Cloth Hall, an adjoining half timbered granary, and the 15th-century St Nicolas Church, along with 17th- and 18th-century listed buildings. As well as being home to Newbury Racecourse, it is the headquarters of Vodafone and software company Micro Focus International.

In the suburban village of Donnington lies the part-ruined Donnington Castle and the surrounding hills are home to some of the country's most famous racehorse training grounds (centred on nearby Lambourn). To the south is a narrower range of hills including Walbury Hill and a few private landscape gardens and mansions, such as Highclere Castle. The local economy is inter-related to that of the eastern M4 corridor, which has most of its industrial, logistical and research businesses close to Newbury, mostly around Reading, Bracknell, Maidenhead and Slough. Together with the adjoining town of Thatcham,  distant, Newbury forms the principal part of an urban area of approximately 70,000 people.

History 

There was a Mesolithic settlement at Newbury. Artefacts were recovered from the Greenham Dairy Farm in 1963, and the Faraday Road site in 2002. Additional material was found in excavations along the route of the Newbury Bypass. Newbury was founded late in the 11th century following the Norman conquest as a new borough, hence its name. Although there are references to the borough that predate the Domesday Book it is not mentioned by name in the survey. However, its existence within the manor of Ulvritone is evident from the massive rise in value of that manor at a time when most manors were worth less than in Saxon times. In 1086 the Domesday Book assesses the borough as having land for 12 ploughs, 2 mills, woodland for 25 pigs, 11 villeins (resident farmhands, unfree peasant who owed his lord labour services), 11 bordars (unfree peasants with less land than villans/villeins), and 51 enclosures (private parks) rendering 70s 7d.

Doubt has been cast over the existence of Newbury Castle, but the town did have royal connections and was visited a number of times by King John and Henry III while hunting in the area. The first reference to a bridge on the site of the current Newbury Bridge is an account of its reconstruction in the 14th Century. In 1312, King Edward II directed that its bridge should be kept in good order. The bridge was presumably rebuilt, as it is recorded that in 1644 a guard was placed on the bridge.

Historically, the town's economic foundation was the cloth trade. This is reflected in the person of the 16th-century cloth magnate, Jack of Newbury, the proprietor of what may well have been the first factory in England, and the later tale of the Newbury Coat. The latter was the outcome of a bet as to whether a gentleman's suit could be produced by the end of the day from wool taken from a sheep's back at the beginning. The local legend was later immortalized in a humorous novel by Elizabethan writer Thomas Deloney. Newbury was the site of two battles during the English Civil War, the First Battle of Newbury (at Wash Common) in 1643, and the Second Battle of Newbury (at Speen) in 1644. The nearby Donnington Castle was reduced to a ruin in the aftermath of the second battle. The disruption of trade during the civil war, compounded by a collapse of the local cloth trade in the late 16th century, left Newbury impoverished. 

The local economy was boosted in the 18th century by the rise of Bath as a popular destination for the wealthy escaping London's summer heat and associated stench. Newbury was roughly halfway between London and Bath and an obvious stopping point in the two-day journey. Soon Newbury, and the Speenhamland area in particular, was filled with coaching inns of ever increasing grandeur and size. One inn, the George & Pelican, was reputed to have stabling for 300 horses. A theatre was built to provide the travellers with entertainment featuring the major stars of the age. In 1795 local magistrates, meeting at the George and Pelican Inn in Speenhamland, introduced the Speenhamland System which tied parish poor relief (welfare payments) to the cost of bread. 

In 1723, the Kennet Navigation made the River Kennet navigable downstream from Newbury to the River Thames in Reading. Some 70 years later, in 1794, work started on the centre section of the Kennet and Avon Canal, which would extend the Kennet Navigation to Bath, thus providing a through water route between London and Bristol via Newbury. This route was finally completed in 1810. As a result, Newbury became something of a backwater market town, with an economy based largely on agriculture and horse-racing. In the 1980s, British electronics firm Racal decided to locate their newly formed telecommunications company Racal Vodafone, later Vodafone UK, in the town. In the subsequent decades Newbury became something of a regional centre for the high-tech industries, and the town has since enjoyed a return to general economic prosperity.

Greenham Common 

A large Royal Air Force station was established during the Second World War at Greenham Common on the edge of the town. In the 1950s, it became home to US Air Force bombers and tankers, for which it was equipped with the longest military runway in the United Kingdom. In the 1980s, it became one of only two USAF bases in the UK equipped with ground-launched nuclear-armed cruise missiles, causing it to become the site of protests by up to 40,000 protesters and the establishment of the Greenham Common Women's Peace Camp. With the end of the Cold War, the base was closed, the runway was broken up, much of it used as fill material in building the Newbury bypass, and the area was restored to heathland. This project then saw Greenham and Crookham commons reopened to the public in 2000.

1943 Bombing 
On 10 February 1943, two German bombers, Dornier Do 217s from ll/KG40 Bomber unit in Holland, on a nuisance raid, followed the Great Western Railway line running west from London. One of the bombers headed towards Reading while the other followed the line all the way to Newbury. At 4:43pm the bomber dropped eight high-explosive bombs over the town. There had been no time for a warning siren. The Senior Council School, St. Bartholomew's Almshouses, St. John's Church (just the altar was left standing) and Southampton Terrace were all destroyed, and another 265 dwellings were damaged, many of which had to be demolished. St John's Church was completely rebuilt after the war. 15 people were killed and a further 41 people were injured, 25 seriously.

Government 

 

Newbury is the administrative centre of the district administered by the unitary authority of West Berkshire, which as of 2011 has a population of 153,822 (an approximately straight-line increase of 15,022 since 1991). Newbury is also a civil parish, with parish council responsibilities undertaken by Newbury Town Council, based at Newbury Town Hall, since 1997. Newbury Town Council currently has 23 councillors, representing seven wards of the town, currently: Brummel Grove, Clay Hill, Falkland, Northcroft, Pyle Hill, Victoria and St Johns.  As of 2019, 19 of the councillors represent the Liberal Democrats, 2 represent the Conservative Party and 2 represent the Greens. 

In the House of Commons, the town is in the Newbury constituency. Since the general election of December 2019 this constituency has been represented by Laura Farris, a Conservative. From 1999 to 2020 Newbury was part of the South East England European Parliament constituency electing MEPs by proportional representation. The twinning was held at The Corn Exchange Newbury. Newbury is twinned with the following:
 Braunfels in Germany (1963)
 Bagnols-sur-Cèze in France (1970) 
 Eeklo in Belgium (1974)
 Feltre in Italy (2003)
 Carcaixent in Spain. (2019)

Geography 

The Civil Parish of Newbury consists of the town and the suburbs of Wash Common, The City, West Fields, East Fields and Speenhamland. The modern conurbation of Newbury, however, with close bus and road links and almost contiguous development, may be taken to include the surrounding villages of Speen, Donnington, Shaw and Greenham. Speen, which is now a suburb of western Newbury, is roughly equidistant between Bristol and London.

Elevations vary from a minimum of 72 m above mean sea level to 122 m at Wash Common. Elevations reach 150–200 m in the directly adjoining hills. The River Kennet and the Kennet and Avon Canal flow east through the centre of the town to reach the Thames at Reading, while the River Lambourn (beside which is the country's largest horse-training paddocks in the Valley of the Lambourn Downs) partly forms its northern boundary, ending in the town. A tributary that is smaller still, the River Enborne, forms the southern boundary (and also the county boundary with Hampshire). 

Adjoining the town's south-eastern border is Greenham Common and the famous Newbury Racecourse. Newbury is surrounded on three sides (north, west and south) by the North Wessex Downs.  The downland to the south rises steeply out of the river valley providing scenic views, including Watership Down (made famous by the novel of the same name), Beacon Hill, the southeast's highest point Walbury Hill, and Combe Gibbet.

Demography
Newbury has two very narrowly buffered settlements, Thatcham (25,267
inh. as at 2011) and Shaw cum Donnington (1,686 inh. as at 2011) forming an identifiable, informal greater Newbury urban and suburban conglomeration.  In major use classes 11% of Newbury's land is occupied by roads and as of 2005, 34% of its land was occupied by domestic gardens.

Economy

Newbury and its immediate surroundings constitute the major commercial and retail centre of West Berkshire. The local economy is inter-related to that of the eastern M4 corridor which has most of its industrial, logistical and research businesses close to Newbury, Reading and Slough, with smaller industrial estates in the county at Theale, Bracknell and Maidenhead. Newbury is home to the United Kingdoms headquarters of the mobile network operator Vodafone, which is the town's largest employer with over 6,000 workers. Before moving to their £129 million headquarters in the outskirts of the town in 2002, Vodafone used 64 buildings spread across the town centre.

As well as Vodafone, Newbury is also home to the United Kingdom headquarters of National Instruments, Micro Focus, Stryker Corporation, Grass Valley (formerly Snell Advanced Media which was formerly Quantel), Cognito, EValue and Newbury Building Society. The pharmaceutical company Bayer AG are also headquartered in the town, although in October 2015 the company announced their intention to move to the Green Park Business Park near Reading.

Transport 

Newbury spans the River Kennet, the valley of which has for millennia formed an important east–west transport route, served by the Kennet and Avon Canal, and the Reading to Taunton Line, one of three routes from London to the West Country.

Rail
It was also served by the Didcot, Newbury and Southampton Railway until this closed in the 1960s.

Road
Following a similar east–west route is the A4 road from London to Bristol, historically the main route west from London.  This road has been superseded as a long-distance route by the M4 motorway which runs almost parallel and can be accessed  to the north at the Chieveley interchange at Junction 13. At Newbury this east–west route is crossed by a dual-carriageway north–south trunk road, from the major south coast port of Southampton to the industrial centres of the Midlands. Although this route was once served by the Didcot, Newbury and Southampton Railway, today it is only served by the A34 road, which now bypasses Newbury to the west on an alignment partially using the old rail route (see also 'Newbury Bypass' below).

Until the completion of the bypass, the A34 and A4 met in the town centre at the Robin Hood Roundabout, a complicated gyratory system encompassing 6 approaching roads, a fire station, ambulance station and an exit on the inside of the roundabout, which has a north–south flyover across the roundabout. In 2007, the sculpture Couple in Conversation was unveiled on the roundabout, providing a new landmark for one of the major gateways into the town. Other significant roads radiating from Newbury include the A339 which now includes the renumbered part of the old A34 through the town centre and then heads towards Basingstoke and the M3 motorway, the A343 to Andover, the B4000 to Lambourn, the B4494 to Wantage and the B4009 to Streatley.

Bus services
Most local bus services were provided by Newbury Buses, a division of Reading Buses before August 2011. This was when they were transferred to private companies. The Link and route 7 remain in private hands, operated by Stagecoach South, with West Berkshire Connect also operating a couple of services. The main operator being Weavaway Travel, trading as Newbury & District. However, West Berkshire Council contracted services were transferred back to Reading Buses, who continue to operate the Vodafone Buses and the Jet Black 1 service, initially alongside Weavaway, under the Kennections brand in September 2016. 2 years later, in September 2018, they also acquired Newbury & District from Weavaway.

Newbury bypass
The town's location at the intersection of the routes from London to Bristol and from Southampton to Birmingham made it, for many years, a transport bottleneck. The ring road around the town still suffered serious congestion and the Newbury bypass was proposed in 1981. The plans were approved in 1990. 

However they were extremely controversial and this led to a major environmentalist campaign opposing the road development (dubbed the Third Battle of Newbury by parts of the national media). In spite of this, the road was built and finally opened in 1998. Within two months the road surface began to break up and the entire length of the bypass was eventually resurfaced over two weekends using an improved low-noise water-absorbent surface. In August 2004, the improved A34-M4 junction was re-opened which allowed north–south traffic on the A34 to completely bypass the earlier roundabout at the M4. This junction continued to be improved, with new road markings and traffic signals completed in 2008.

Education 
Newbury has three main secondary schools:
 St. Bartholomew's School – one of the oldest schools in Berkshire, founded in 1466.
 Park House School
 Trinity School, formed after the closure of Shaw House School and Turnpike School.

There is also Newbury College, a further and higher education college, funded by a private finance initiative, and Mary Hare School, a residential co-educational community special needs school for deaf pupils.

Independent schools nearby include:
 Horris Hill, an all-boys day and boarding school (from ages 4 to 13; boarding from 7 to 13)
 Downe House School
 Cheam School
 St Gabriel's School, an all-girls school (from the ages 3 to 18)
 Thorngrove School, a day co-educational school in nearby Highclere (from the ages 2½ to 13)
 Newbury Hall School, an international high school
 St Michael's School, a Roman Catholic school in Burghclere

Sports and leisure 

Newbury is home to one of England's major racecourses, Newbury Racecourse, which celebrated its centenary in 2005. The most prestigious race in the calendar is the Hennessy Gold Cup which normally takes place in late November. Newbury has one of the last remaining lidos in the United Kingdom. It was originally built in the 1890s, although the structure we see today was erected in the 1930s.  The pool is still in use today and is capable of receiving more than 1000 visitors a day during peak times.  It is owned and subsidised by West Berkshire Council but is managed by an external contractor, Parkwood Leisure.

Newbury's rugby union club, Newbury R.F.C. sponsored by Vodafone, is based in the town. The club was founded in 1928 and in 1996 moved to a new purpose-built ground at Monks Lane,  which has since hosted England U21 fixtures. Cricket clubs in the town include Newbury Cricket Club, situated right in the town centre, and Falkland CC. Newbury also has two athletics clubs: Team Kennet and Newbury Athletics Club. Newbury District Leagues exist in many other sports such as badminton, table tennis, squash and darts.

Newbury was home to A.F.C. Newbury, also sponsored by Vodafone] but in May 2006 Vodafone ended its sponsorship of the club, following which the club collapsed. A local pub team from the Old London Apprentice took over the ground temporarily and now compete in the Reading League as Newbury F.C. Their future at the ground is uncertain as the owner, West Berkshire Council, plans to turn it into a car park. Victoria Park, near the centre of the town, is used for several events during the year such as the Newbury Waterways Festival, the Keep Off The Grass (KOTG) dance music event and Crafty Craft, an improvised raft race along the canal.

Newbury Library moved to a new building in July 2000. The Corn Exchange provides a venue for both professional and amateur live performances. Other theatres near the town are the Watermill Theatre, and New Greenham Arts on the former Greenham Common air force base. Annually the Newbury Spring Festival of classical music brings internationally renowned soloists and ensembles to a variety of venues in and around the town. The Newbury Comedy Festival, which started in 2004, has become a feature in the town's cultural calendar. Newbury is also home to the Donnington Grove estate, where a golf course was opened in 1993. The Donnington Grove mansion, built between 1763 and 1772, is a local historic landmark.

Media 
There are four main local radio stations broadcasting in the Newbury area; BBC Radio Berkshire; a community radio station, Kennet Radio; and two Independent Local Radio stations  – Greatest Hits Radio Berkshire & North Hampshire (formerly 'Newbury Sound', 'Kick FM', 'Kestrel FM' and 'The Breeze') which broadcasts from Newbury, and Heart South (formerly 2-Ten FM) which broadcasts into the area from nearby Reading. Film and media production companies in Newbury include 822 Productions, Preview Productions, Dudleigh Films and MWS Media, based at Greenham Business Park. The following local newspapers are distributed in Newbury (circulation):
 Newbury Weekly News (Part of Newbury Weekly News, advertising-funded free paper) (33,400)
 Newbury & Thatcham Chronicle (21,500)
 Newbury Weekly News (24,300)

Places of interest 
.
 'The Corn Exchange' – theatre and cinema.
 Kennet and Avon Canal shop and tearooms.
 West Berkshire Museum.
 Jack of Newbury's House.
 St Nicolas' Church (CofE), completed in 1532. This is a fine example of a parish church built entirely in the Perpendicular style.
 St Joseph's Church, Newbury, Roman Catholic church with Italianate architecture.
 St Bartholomew's Hospital (almshouses).
 Raymond Almshouses, Newtown Road, built in 1796, founded by Philip Jemmett of Kintbury, and endowed by his daughter Anne and her husband Sir Jonathan Raymond, Alderman of the City of London.
 The Litten Chapel.
 The Falkland Memorial.
 Donnington Castle.
 Nearby places of interest include Bucklebury Farm Park, Combe Gibbet, Highclere Castle, the Sandham Memorial Chapel, The Nature Discovery Centre, the Watermill Theatre and Watership Down.
 New Greenham Arts – an ex-US military building on Greenham Common airbase, now used to house artist studios, and a performing arts centre.
 Disused GAMA cruise missile storage area at Greenham Common.
 Greenham Control Tower cafe and museum.

Notable people 

A number of notable people have originated from, worked, lived or died in Newbury:
 Richard Adams (1920–2016) – author
 Hannah Aldworth (?–1778) – philanthropist
 Roger Attfield (1939–) – thoroughbred horse trainer
 Francis Baily (1774–1844) – astronomer
 Captain Collet Barker (1784–1831) – early Australian explorer
 Michael Bond (1926–2017) – creator of Paddington Bear
 Harry Bowl (1914–?) – footballer
 Bruno Brookes (1959–) – radio and television presenter
 Lord Carey (1935–) – former Archbishop of Canterbury
 Lawrence Chaney (1996–) – drag performer
 Simon Channing-Williams (1945–2009) – film producer
 Keith Chegwin (1957–2017) – television presenter
 Harry Cotterell (1841–1925) – British trader
 Miles or Myles Coverdale (1488–1569) – bishop, co-author of the 1st English Bible
 George Dangerfield (1904–1986) – journalist and author
 Sebastian Faulks (1953–) – author
 Gerald Finzi (1901–1956) – composer and founder of the Newbury String Players
 Jill Fraser (1946–2006) – Watermill Theatre owner and director
 William Henry Gore (1857–1942) – painter of the Berkshire countryside, born and died in Newbury.
 James Hanson, Lord Hanson (1922–2004) – haulier, later venture capitalist
 Alec Hopkins (1986–) – actor who played the young Severus Snape in Harry Potter and the Order of the Phoenix
 Sir Michael Hordern (1911–1995) – actor
 Luke Humphries (1995–) – professional darts player
 John Kendrick (1573–1624) – philanthropic patron of the town of Reading
 Edwin Lewis (1881–1959) – Methodist theologian
 William Marshal "The Marshal" seen as first Lord Marshal – (1147–1219) medieval knight given up as a hostage at 'Newbury Castle'
 Henry Martin (?-1866) – British murderer
 Jack O'Newbury (1489–1557) – cloth merchant and patron

 John Septimus Roe (1797–1878) – the first Surveyor-General of Western Australia
 "Lord" George Sanger (1825–1911) – circus owner born in Newbury who gave the Queen Victoria statue to the town in 1902
 Hannah Snell (1723–1792) – female soldier
 Edward C. ('Ted') Titchmarsh (1899–1963) – leading 20th-century theoretical mathematician
 Theo Walcott (1989–) – footballer, originally for A.F.C. Newbury.  Currently plays as a forward for Southampton, previously played for Arsenal and Everton
 Sir Frank Williams (1942–2021) – Formula One manager, founded the WilliamsF1 team

Nobles killed at the First Battle of Newbury
 Earl of Carnarvon
 Earl of Sunderland
 Lord Falkland

See also 

 Newbury power station

References

Sources

 Higgott Tony (2001). The Story of Newbury. Countryside Books.
 Money, Walter (1887). History of Newbury. Oxford.

External links 

 Newbury Town Council
 Newbury Twin Town Association
 The History of Newbury District
 Newbury Community Website
 
 A History of RAF Greenham Common and RAF Welford

 
Market towns in Berkshire
Civil parishes in Berkshire
West Berkshire District
Kennet and Avon Canal
Towns in Berkshire